Neotelphusa cirrhomacula is a moth of the family Gelechiidae. It is found in South Africa.

References

Endemic moths of South Africa
Moths described in 1958
Neotelphusa